The Pas Airport  is located  northeast of The Pas, Manitoba, Canada, near the southern shore of Clearwater Lake.

RCAF Aerodrome The Pas
Three runways were listed as follows:

The runways are listed as under construction, serviceable.

Airlines and destinations

See also

The Pas/Grace Lake Airport
The Pas/Grace Lake Water Aerodrome

References

External links

Certified airports in Manitoba
Airfields of the United States Army Air Forces Air Transport Command in North America
Airfields of the United States Army Air Forces in Canada
Transport in The Pas